Newton Jarman (10 September 1886 – 23 January 1947) was a South African cricketer. He played in six first-class matches for Border in 1910/11.

See also
 List of Border representative cricketers

References

External links
 

1886 births
1947 deaths
South African cricketers
Border cricketers
Sportspeople from Qonce